The first Nevada Territorial Legislature first convened on October 1, 1861. It consisted of the Council with ten seats and the House of Representatives with fifteen seats.

Background 
The Territory of Nevada was created on March 2, 1861 out of the western part of Utah Territory. On July 24, Governor James W. Nye ordered elections for the territorial legislature and a census to determine the districts. The elections were held on August 31.

Session 
One regular session was held between October 1 and November 29, 1861. The meeting place was the top floor of Warm Springs Hotel just outside Carson City, that was owned by Abraham Curry. Laws that were passed included ones creating the original nine counties, determining the county seats, and ratifying Governor Nye's decision to select Carson City as the capital of the territory. A total of 107 pieces of legislation were passed.

Members

Council

House of Representatives

References 

1861 in Nevada Territory
Nevada Legislature